Jodelle Micah Ferland (born October 9, 1994) is a Canadian actress. She debuted as a child actress at the age of four in the television film Mermaid (2000) for which she won a Young Artist Award and received a Daytime Emmy Award nomination, making her the youngest nominee in Emmy history. Her career progressed with roles in the television film Carrie (2002), the horror films They (2002), Tideland (2005), Silent Hill (2006) and Case 39 (2009), and the comedy film Good Luck Chuck (2007). She also led the television series Kingdom Hospital (2004).

From the 2010s, Ferland had roles in the romantic fantasy film The Twilight Saga: Eclipse (2010) and the horror films The Cabin in the Woods (2011) and The Tall Man (2012). She has also starred in the television series Dark Matter (2015–2017), which earned her a Saturn Award nomination.

Early life
Ferland was born in Nanaimo, British Columbia, Canada, the daughter of Valerie and Marc Ferland.

Career

2000–2010 
Ferland started her career in commercials at the age of two, and made her acting debut at age four in the television film Mermaid. For her performance, she received a Daytime Emmy Award nomination, making her the youngest nominee of the award. She made guest appearances in several television series, including Stargate Atlantis, Dark Angel, Stargate SG-1, Smallville and Supernatural, and appeared in films including They and Trapped.

In 2005, she starred in the Terry Gilliam drama Tideland, for which she received a Genie Award nomination in the Best Actress category. Later, she appeared in the 2006 film Silent Hill, an adaptation of the well-known video game, and had a supporting role in Good Luck Chuck for Lions Gate Entertainment. In 2006, she was cast opposite Renée Zellweger in the horror movie Case 39 as Lillith Sullivan, which was released in 2009; production was delayed after a fire destroyed the film set in October 2006.

In 2010, Ferland played Bree Tanner in the romantic fantasy film Eclipse, the third film of the Twilight series. "Usually I read the script before I take a role, but I haven't read this one," she explained. "It's Twilight; of course, I'm going to take it." From 2010 to 2011, she provided voice work for the videogame BioShock 2 and its downloadable content, appeared in the SyFy movie Ice Quake, and starred in the Lifetime television movie Girl Fight.

2011–present 
In 2012, Ferland appeared in the drama Mighty Fine, the horror film The Tall Man, Joss Whedon's The Cabin in the Woods, and had her first starring role in a comedy, in Home Alone: The Holiday Heist. For The Cabin in the Woods, filming took place in 2009. She also had a leading voice role in the stop-motion animated film ParaNorman, which earned an Academy Award nomination.

From 2013 to 2014, she starred in the family film Midnight Stallion, the short film Monster, and the crime drama film A Warden's Ransom. In 2015, she starred in the short film The Goodbye Girl and the horror film The Unspoken, which premiered at the Film4 Frightfest Film Festival on October 24. In 2016 she appeared in the Lifetime television movie My Daughter's Disgrace, and provided the narration for the audio book Wonder Women, written by Sam Maggs.

From 2015 to 2017, Ferland starred as Five in the SyFy series Dark Matter, based on the comic book series of the same name. On the role, she stated "On my latest show Dark Matter people teased me because I was the youngest in the cast but I had been acting the longest.’ She received a nomination for the Saturn Award for Best Performance by a Younger Actor in a Television Series in 2016. In 2017, she appeared in the comedy Bigger Fatter Liar, the sequel to the 2002 movie and the horror film Neverknock.

In 2018, she appeared in an episode of Frankie Drake Mysteries. The same year, Ferland starred as Olive in the digital series Darken: Before the Dark, a prequel to the film Darken. She is set to appear in the short film Women Seen directed by Amanda Tapping.

Filmography

Film

Television

Video games

Audiobooks
 Wonder Women (2016) by Sam Maggs, as Narrator

Awards and nominations

Notes

References

External links

 
 

1994 births
Actresses from British Columbia
Canadian child actresses
Canadian film actresses
Canadian television actresses
Canadian voice actresses
Audiobook narrators
Living people
People from Nanaimo
20th-century Canadian actresses
21st-century Canadian actresses